The 1973–74 All-Ireland Senior Club Hurling Championship was the fourth staging of the All-Ireland Senior Club Hurling Championship, the Gaelic Athletic Association's premier inter-county club hurling tournament. The championship began on 28 October 1973 and ended on 28 April 1974.

Glen Rovers of Cork were the defending champions, however, they failed to qualify after being defeated by Blackrock in the final of the Cork Championship.

On 28 April 1974, Blackrock won the championship after a 3–08 to 1–09 defeat of Rathnure in the All-Ireland final replay. It was second championship title overall and their first title since 1972.

Dan Quigley of Rathnure was the championship's top scorer with 4-42.

Format
The 1973–74 club championship was played on a straight knock-out basis.  Each of the participating counties entered their respective club champions.  The format of the competition was as follows:

Provincial Championships

The Leinster, Connacht, Munster and Ulster championships were played on a straight knock-out basis. The four respective champions from these provinces advanced directly to the All-Ireland semi-finals.

All-Ireland Series

Semi-finals: (2 matches) The Munster champions played the Ulster champions while the Leinster champions played the Connacht champions.  The winners of these two games contested the All-Ireland club final.

Results

Connacht Senior Club Hurling Championship

Semi-final

Final

Leinster Senior Club Hurling Championship

First round

Quarter-finals

Semi-finals

Final

Munster Senior Club Hurling Championship

Quarter-finals

Semi-finals

Final

Ulster Senior Club Hurling Championship

Semi-final

Final

All-Ireland Senior Club Hurling Championship

Semi-finals

Finals

Championship statistics

Top scorers

Overall

Miscellaneous

 Dan Quigley's tally of 1-15 for Rathnure is the highest-ever personal tally for an individual in a Leinster final.

References

1973 in hurling
1974 in hurling
All-Ireland Senior Club Hurling Championship